Xylosteus spinolae is the species of the Lepturinae subfamily in long-horned beetle family. This beetle is distributed in Austria, Bosnia and Herzegovina, Bulgaria, Croatia, Italy, Montenegro, North Macedonia, Romania, Serbia, Slovenia, and Turkey. Adult beetle feeds on flowers of common filbert, and common beech.

Subspecies 
There are two subspecies of the species:
 Xylosteus spinolae caucasicola (Plavistshikov, 1936)
 Synonym: Xylosteus caucasicola Plavilstshikov, 1936
 Xylosteus spinolae spinolae Frivaldsky, 1838

References

Lepturinae
Beetles described in 1838